Stephen Brett (born 23 November 1985) is a New Zealand rugby union former player. He is the head coach for Rugby ATL in Major League Rugby (MLR).

Playing career
Brett was a versatile back whose preferred position was first five-eighth, although he could also play second five-eighth and fullback. He is the stepson of former Canterbury and New Zealand centre Victor Simpson. He worked on improving his goal kicking and defensive skills, which led some to suggest Brett's primary weakness is in his defence, thus impeding his progress to higher levels.

Super 14
Brett made his Super Rugby debut in 2006 for the Crusaders but had to wait until the following season to make his mark. With regular first-five Daniel Carter being unavailable for much of the season due to the World Cup conditioning program, Brett seized his chance in the number 10 jersey and finished 2007 as the Crusader's top scorer with 90 points. He continued his good form into the 2008 competition, scoring a try and picking up the Man of the Match award in the Crusaders brilliant 54–19 victory over reigning champions the Bulls in Pretoria, before breaking his collarbone in a 55–7 win against the Cheetahs; the injury sidelined Brett for around six weeks. He was signed by the Blues for the 2010 and 2011 seasons,

Japan and France
On 29 July 2011, Brett left New Zealand to join Japanese club Toyota Verblitz in the Top League on a two-year contract.

On 22 April 2013, Brett left Japan to sign for Bayonne in the French Top 14 from the start of the 2013–14 season. On 17 April 2014, Brett left Bayonne as he signed for another French side, Lyon in the Top 14 on a two-year contract from the 2014–15 season.

Coaching
Brett then transferred his rugby skills into coaching, serving as an Assistant Coach to the now defunct Colorado Raptors and is now the current Attack Coach for Rugby ATL in the Major League Rugby competition in the USA.

References

1985 births
Living people
New Zealand rugby union players
Canterbury rugby union players
Blues (Super Rugby) players
Crusaders (rugby union) players
Toyota Verblitz players
Aviron Bayonnais players
Rugby union fly-halves
Rugby union centres
Māori All Blacks players
New Zealand expatriate rugby union players
New Zealand expatriate sportspeople in France
New Zealand expatriate sportspeople in Japan
Expatriate rugby union players in Japan
Expatriate rugby union players in France
People educated at Christchurch Boys' High School
People from Waiouru
Rugby union players from Manawatū-Whanganui